Events in the year 2023 in Haiti.

Incumbents 

 President: Ariel Henry (acting)
 Prime Minister: Ariel Henry (acting)

Events 

Ongoing – COVID-19 pandemic in Haiti; 2018–2023 Haitian crisis

 January 26 – Ten police officers are killed, one is critically injured and another is missing during a series of attacks in Port-au-Prince, by the Gan Grif gang.
 February 1 – Jamaican Prime Minister Andrew Holness says that his government is willing to send troops to Haiti as part of a "multinational security assistance deployment".
 February 16 – Canada announces that it will deploy navy vessels to Haiti for intelligence-gathering amid a worsening security situation in the Caribbean country. 

Scheduled

 2023 Haitian constitutional referendum

Holidays 

 January 1 – New Year's Day and Independence Day, celebrating 217 years since the signing of the Haitian Declaration of Independence.
 January 2 – Ancestry Day, honors those who fought for independence.
 February 16 – Haitian Carnival and Mardi Gras.
 October 17 – Dessalines Day, commemorating 215 years since the death of Haiti's first leader.
 November 1–2 — All Saints' Day and All Souls' Day are celebrated in both the Christian and Haitian Vodou religion.

See also 

2020s
2023 Atlantic hurricane season

References 

 
2020s in Haiti
Years of the 21st century in Haiti
Haiti
Haiti